The 1950 Campeonato Paulista da Primeira Divisão, organized by the Federação Paulista de Futebol, was the 49th season of São Paulo's top professional football league. Palmeiras won the title for the 12th time. no teams were relegated and the top scorer was Portuguesa's Pinga with 22 goals.

Championship
The championship was disputed in a double-round robin system, with the team with the most points winning the title. Originally, the team with the fewest points would be relegated, but the last-placed team of that year, Jabaquara, appealed to the sports courts, alleging that since it was one of FPF's founding members, the federation rules allowed the club to never be relegated. as a consequence, fellow founding members Comercial, that had been relegated in the previous year and had failed to be promoted, found itself invited back into the First Level.

Results

Top Scores

References

Campeonato Paulista seasons
Paulista